Azobisisobutyronitrile (abbreviated AIBN) is an organic compound with the formula [(CH3)2C(CN)]2N2. This white powder is soluble in alcohols and common organic solvents but is insoluble in water. It is often used as a foamer in plastics and rubber and as a radical initiator. 

As an azo initiator, radicals resulting from AIBN have multiple benefits over common organic peroxides. For example, they do not have oxygenated byproducts or much yellow discoloration. Additionally, they do not cause too much grafting and therefore are often used when making adhesives, acrylic fibers, detergents, etc.

Mechanism of decomposition
In its most characteristic reaction, AIBN decomposes,  eliminating a molecule of nitrogen gas to form two 2-cyanoprop-2-yl radicals:

Because azobisisobutyronitrile readily gives off free radicals, it is often used as a radical initiator. This happens at temperatures above 40 °C, but in experiments is more commonly done at temperatures between 66 °C and 72 °C. This decomposition has a ΔG‡ of 131 kJ/mol and results in two 2-cyano-2-propyl (carbon) radicals and a molecule of nitrogen gas. The release of nitrogen gas pushes this decomposition forward due to the increase in entropy. And the 2-cyano-2-propyl radical is stabilized by the −CN group.

Chemical reactions 
These radicals formed by the decomposition of AIBN can initiate free-radical polymerizations and other radical-induced reactions. For instance, a mixture of styrene and maleic anhydride in toluene will react if heated, forming the copolymer upon addition of AIBN. Another example of a radical reaction that can be initiated by AIBN is the anti-Markovnikov hydrohalogenation of alkenes.

Benzylic bromination 
AIBN can be used as the radical initiator for Wohl–Ziegler bromination.

AIBN and tributyltin hydride (HSnBu3) reaction

Reaction 
AIBN decomposes to create the 2-cyano-2-propyl radical, which then abstracts the hydrogen off of tributyltin hydride. This results in a tributyltin radical, which can be used in numerous reactions. For example, this radical could be used to remove a bromine from an alkene.

Mechanism

Hydrohalogenation of alkenes

Reaction 
This reaction starts out with AIBN decomposing into 2-cyano-2-propyl radicals that abstract a hydrogen from HBr to leave a bromine radical. This bromine radical adds to the alkene. In the hydrohalogenation of an alkene using AIBN, the halogen's regioselectivity is anti-Markovnikov.

Mechanism

Poly(acrylic acid) production 
It's in production of poly(acrylic acid).

Production and analogues
AIBN is produced from acetone cyanohydrin and hydrazine, then followed by oxidation:
2 (CH3)2C(CN)OH  +  N2H4  →   [(CH3)2C(CN)]2N2H2  +  2 H2O
 [(CH3)2C(CN)]2N2H2  +  Cl2  →    [(CH3)2C(CN)]2N2  +  2 HCl
Related azo compounds behave similarly, such as 1,1′-azobis(cyclohexanecarbonitrile). Water-soluble azo initiators are also available.

Another possible way to produce AIBN 
AIBN can also be produced by the reaction shown below.

Safety
AIBN is safer to use than benzoyl peroxide (another radical initiator) because the risk of explosion is far less. However, it is still considered as an explosive compound, decomposing above 65 °C.  A respirator dust mask, protective gloves and safety glasses are recommended. Pyrolysis of AIBN without a trap for the formed 2-cyanopropyl radicals results in the formation of tetramethylsuccinonitrile, which is highly toxic.

References

External links

Azo compounds
Radical initiators